The Asian Tour 2013/2014 – Event 4 (also known as the 2014 Dongguan Open) was a professional minor-ranking snooker tournament that took place between 4–8 March 2014 at the Dongguan Dongcheng Sports Garden in Dongguan, China.

Stuart Bingham won his ninth professional title by defeating Liang Wenbo 4–1 in the final.

Prize fund and ranking points 
The breakdown of prize money and ranking points of the event is shown below:

1 Only professional players can earn ranking points.

Main draw

Top half

Section 1

Section 2

Section 3

Section 4

Bottom half

Section 5

Section 6

Section 7

Section 8

Finals

Century breaks 

 143, 113, 111  Liang Wenbo
 137, 111, 103, 101  Ding Junhui
 136, 123, 105, 103  Yu Delu
 136  Michael Leslie
 133, 103  Alan McManus
 131  Zhou Yuelong
 127, 126  Ken Doherty

 127  Jimmy White
 125  Gary Wilson
 124, 116  Barry Pinches
 112  Robert Milkins
 105, 100  Stuart Bingham
 104  Rouzi Maimaiti
 102  Feng Yu

References

External links
 Dongguan Open 2014 (APTC 4) at Facebook

AT4
2014 in Chinese sport
Snooker competitions in China
March 2014 sports events in China